Inner loop may refer to:

Inner loop in computer programs
Inner Loop (Phoenix), a section of Interstate 10 in downtown Phoenix, Arizona, United States
Inner Loop (Rochester), an expressway around downtown Rochester, New York, United States
Inner Loop (Washington, D.C.), a previously proposed freeway loop in Washington, D.C., United States
Inner–outer directions, where "inner loop" is used to describe the clockwise traveling lanes of a roadway
This usage of "inner loop" is commonly applied to the clockwise roadway of Interstate 495 (Capital Beltway)
Interstate 610 (Texas), the innermost highway loop around the central area of Houston, Texas, United States